Guo Daen (born February 28, 1971, in Wuhan, Hubei) is a Chinese sprint canoer who competed in the late 1980s. At the 1988 Summer Olympics in Seoul, he was eliminated in the repechages of the C-2 500 m event and again in the semifinals of the C-2 1000 m event.

References

Sports-Reference.com profile

1971 births
Living people
Sportspeople from Wuhan
Olympic canoeists of China
Asian Games medalists in canoeing
Canoeists at the 1990 Asian Games
Chinese male canoeists

Asian Games gold medalists for China
Medalists at the 1990 Asian Games
Canoeists at the 1988 Summer Olympics